Pomona is an unincorporated community in Yakima County, Washington, United States, located immediately northeast of Selah.

The community was established in 1885 around a train station the Northern Pacific Railway called Selah. The name was changed to Pomona in 1908 because the Wenas station was commonly called Selah. Edmund Stevens, an agent for the Northern Pacific Railway, suggested the name Pomona in honor of the mythical Roman patron goddess of gardens and fruits.

References

Unincorporated communities in Yakima County, Washington
Northern Pacific Railway
Unincorporated communities in Washington (state)